Lexicography is the study of lexicons, and is divided into two separate academic disciplines. It is the art of compiling dictionaries. 

 Practical lexicography is the art or craft of compiling, writing and editing dictionaries.
 Theoretical lexicography is the scholarly study of semantic, orthographic, syntagmatic and paradigmatic features of lexemes of the lexicon (vocabulary) of a language, developing theories of dictionary components and structures linking the data in dictionaries, the needs for information by users in specific types of situations, and how users may best access the data incorporated in printed and electronic dictionaries. This is sometimes referred to as 'metalexicography'.

There is some disagreement on the definition of lexicology, as distinct from lexicography. Some use "lexicology" as a synonym for theoretical lexicography; others use it to mean a branch of linguistics pertaining to the inventory of words in a particular language.

A person devoted to lexicography is called a lexicographer.

Focus 
General lexicography focuses on the design, compilation, use and evaluation of general dictionaries, i.e. dictionaries that provide a description of the language in general use. Such a dictionary is usually called a general dictionary or LGP dictionary (Language for General Purpose). Specialized lexicography focuses on the design, compilation, use and evaluation of specialized dictionaries, i.e. dictionaries that are devoted to a (relatively restricted) set of linguistic and factual elements of one or more specialist subject fields, e.g. legal lexicography. Such a dictionary is usually called a specialized dictionary or Language for specific purposes dictionary and following Nielsen 1994, specialized dictionaries are either multi-field, single-field or sub-field dictionaries.

It is now widely accepted that lexicography is a scholarly discipline in its own right and not a sub-branch of applied linguistics, as the chief object of study in lexicography is the dictionary (see e.g. Bergenholtz/Nielsen/Tarp 2009).

Lexicography is the practice of creating books, computer programs, or databases that reflect lexicographical work and are intended for public use. These include dictionaries and thesauri which are widely accessible resources that present various aspects of lexicology, such as spelling, pronunciation, and meaning.

Lexicographers are tasked with defining simple words as well as figuring out how compound or complex words or words with many meanings can be clearly explained. They also make decisions regarding which words should be kept, added, or removed from a dictionary. They are responsible for arranging lexical material (usually alphabetically) to facilitate understanding and navigation.

Etymology

Coined in English 1680, the word "lexicography" derives from the Greek λεξικογράφος (lexikographos), "lexicographer", from λεξικόν (lexicon), neut. of λεξικός lexikos, "of or for words", from λέξις (lexis), "speech", "word" (in turn from λέγω (lego), "to say", "to speak") and γράφω (grapho), "to scratch, to inscribe, to write".

Aspects
Practical lexicographic work involves several activities, and the compilation of well-crafted dictionaries requires careful consideration of all or some of the following aspects:
 profiling the intended users (i.e. linguistic and non-linguistic competences) and identifying their needs
 defining the communicative and cognitive functions of the dictionary
 selecting and organizing the components of the dictionary
 choosing the appropriate structures for presenting the data in the dictionary (i.e. frame structure, distribution structure, macro-structure, micro-structure and cross-reference structure)
 selecting words and affixes for systematization as entries
 selecting collocations, phrases and examples
 choosing lemma forms for each word or part of word to be lemmatized
 defining words
 organizing definitions
 specifying pronunciations of words
 labeling definitions and pronunciations for register and dialect, where appropriate
 selecting equivalents in bi- and multi-lingual dictionaries
 translating collocations, phrases and examples in bi- and multilingual dictionaries
 designing the best way in which users can access the data in printed and electronic dictionaries

One important goal of lexicography is to keep the lexicographic information costs incurred by dictionary users as low as possible. Nielsen (2008) suggests relevant aspects for lexicographers to consider when making dictionaries as they all affect the users' impression and actual use of specific dictionaries.

Theoretical lexicography concerns the same aspects as lexicography, but aims to develop principles that can improve the quality of future dictionaries, for instance in terms of access to data and lexicographic information costs. Several perspectives or branches of such academic dictionary research have been distinguished: 'dictionary criticism' (or evaluating the quality of one or more dictionaries, e.g. by means of reviews (see Nielsen 1999), 'dictionary history' (or tracing the traditions of a type of dictionary or of lexicography in a particular country or language), 'dictionary typology' (or classifying the various genres of reference works, such as dictionary versus encyclopedia, monolingual versus bilingual dictionary, general versus technical or pedagogical dictionary), 'dictionary structure' (or formatting the various ways in which the information is presented in a dictionary), 'dictionary use' (or observing the reference acts and skills of dictionary users), and 'dictionary IT' (or applying computer aids to the process of dictionary compilation).

One important consideration is the status of 'bilingual lexicography', or the compilation and use of the bilingual dictionary in all its aspects (see e.g. Nielsen 1894). In spite of a relatively long history of this type of dictionary, it is often said to be less developed in a number of respects than its unilingual counterpart, especially in cases where one of the languages involved is not a major language. Not all genres of reference works are available in interlingual versions, e.g. LSP, learners' and encyclopedic types, although sometimes these challenges produce new subtypes, e.g. 'semi-bilingual' or 'bilingualised' dictionaries such as Hornby's (Oxford) Advanced Learner's Dictionary English-Chinese, which have been developed by translating existing monolingual dictionaries (see Marello 1998).

See also

 Linguistic description
 Dictionary
 Bilingual dictionary
 Monolingual learner's dictionary
 Specialized dictionary (Picture dictionary, Multi-field dictionary, Single-field dictionary, Sub-field dictionary, LSP dictionary)
 Glossary (defining dictionary, Core glossary)
 List of lexicographers
 Lexicology
 Lexicon
 Lexical definition
 Vocabulary
 Idioms Lexicon
 Specialised lexicography
 English lexicology and lexicography
 Terminology
 Dictionary Society of North America
 Dreaming of Words

References

Further reading
 Atkins, B.T.S. & Rundell, Michael (2008) The Oxford Guide to Practical Lexicography, Oxford U.P. 
 Béjoint, Henri (2000) Modern Lexicography: An Introduction, Oxford U.P. 
 Bergenholtz, H., Nielsen, S., Tarp, S. (eds.): Lexicography at a Crossroads: Dictionaries and Encyclopedias Today, Lexicographical Tools Tomorrow. Peter Lang 2009. 
 Bergenholtz, Henning & Tarp, Sven (eds.) (1995) Manual of Specialised Lexicography: The Preparation of Specialised Dictionaries, J. Benjamins. 
 Green, Jonathon (1996) Chasing the Sun: Dictionary-Makers and the Dictionaries They Made, J. Cape. 
 Hartmann, R.R.K. (2001) Teaching and Researching Lexicography, Pearson Education. 
 Hartmann, R.R.K. (ed.) (2003) Lexicography: Critical Concepts, Routledge/Taylor & Francis, 3 volumes. 
 Hartmann, R.R.K. & James, Gregory (comps.) (1998/2001) Dictionary of Lexicography, Routledge. 
 Inglis, Douglas (2004) Cognitive Grammar and lexicography. Payap University Graduate School Linguistics Department.
 Kirkness, Alan (2004) "Lexicography", in The Handbook of Applied Linguistics ed. by A. Davies & C. Elder, Oxford: Blackwell, pp. 54–81. 
 Landau, Sidney (2001) Dictionaries: The Art and Craft of Lexicography, Cambridge U.P. 2nd ed. 
 Marello, Carla (1998) "Hornby's bilingualized dictionaries", in International Journal of Lexicography 11,4, pp. 292–314.
 Nielsen, Sandro (1994) The Bilingual LSP Dictionary, G. Narr. 
 Nielsen, Sandro (2008) "The effect of lexicographical information costs on dictionary making and use", in Lexikos (AFRILEX-reeks/series 18), pp. 170–189.
 Nielsen, Sandro (2009): "Reviewing printed and electronic dictionaries: A theoretical and practical framework". In S. Nielsen/S. Tarp (eds): Lexicography in the 21st Century. In honour of Henning Bergenholtz. Amsterdam/Philadelphia: John Benjamins, 23–41.
 Ooi, Vincent (1998) Computer Corpus Lexicography, Edinburgh U.P.  
 Zgusta, Ladislav (1971) Manual of lexicography (Janua Linguarum. Series maior 39). Prague: Academia / The Hague, Paris: Mouton.

External links

 International Journal of Lexicography
 Lexicographica. International Annual for Lexicography - Revue Internationale de Lexicographie - Internationales Jahrbuch für Lexikographie

Societies
 Centre for Lexicography EN version
 Dictionary Society of North America
 Euralex – European Association for Lexicography
 Afrilex – African Association for Lexicography
 Australex – Australasian Association for Lexicography
 Nordic Federation for Lexicography
 Asialex – Asian Association for Lexicography

 
Lexicology
Applied linguistics
+